Kevin Dowling  (born 28 July 1965) is a former English professional darts player who currently competes in Professional Darts Corporation events.

Career
Dowling before he lose to Stephen Bunting of England in the 2014 UK Open 8–9 (legs).

Dowling quit the PDC in 2020.

He played for 23 Championships

References

External links

Living people
Professional Darts Corporation former tour card holders
English darts players
1965 births
21st-century English people